The 2014 South Lakeland District Council election took place on 22 May 2014 to elect members of South Lakeland District Council in England. This was on the same day as other local elections.

Election results summary

Ward Results

Rob Boden was originally elected as a Liberal Democrat.

By-Elections

References

2014 English local elections
2014
2010s in Cumbria